Ulsavapittennu is a 1988 Indian Malayalam-language drama film directed by Bharath Gopi and written by John Paul. The film stars Mohanlal, Parvathy Jayaram, Jayaram and Sukumaran in the lead roles. The film has musical score composed by G. Devarajan. The film was a commercial success at the box office. Mohanlal won the Kerala State Film Award – Special Jury Award for his performance in the film.

Plot

It is from a festival of the family temple that the movie starts; a very auspicious moment. Once a prestigious Brahmin family, Poovulla Kovilakom is now in the verge of the destruction of all means. The Kovilakom is now administered by Ravi, Ettan Thampuran. His younger brother Aniyan Thampuran (Unni), though an adult, is a meek and gullible person. He has no interest in the matters concerning the governance and administration of a seemingly big family. He often plays with children and among the people of the place, he has gotten no respect and power because of his inefficacy. Ettan Thampuran's misadministration leads the house and family to debts which are exploited by the land-agent Pangunni Nair who arrange people to buy the Kovilakom's land. Ettan Thampuran's wife called ‘ettathi’ is a very domineering kind of a person who does nothing significant. She has a company, Pangunni Nair's daughter with her all the time and with whom Ettan Thampuran has an extra marital relationship of an unwritten consent. Kalyaniyamma, relative of the two brothers, who cares Aniyan Thampuran as a mother cares her child, is one among the only persons who support and understand him. Aniyan Thampuran's friend Madhavan Kutty, though belongs to a lower caste has a relationship with Indira who belongs to the caste or family of Pothuvals. Indira's family has some financial difficulties and their condition is not so good. One day she elopes with Madhavan Kutty. This becomes a piece of news in the place but about which Aniyan Thampuran finds nothing wrong. Indira's brother Rajan is a jobless person who sings in the temple over which the Kovilakom has some power, probably that is passed on from different generations.

A marriage proposal from a not so wealthy and prestigious family comes for Aniyan Thampuran and the marriage takes place. The girl he married, Karthika who belongs to Nair caste, is a person who marries Aniyan Thampuran more for her concerns about her family's poor conditions but later becomes a person who understands Aniyan Thampuran's special behaviors and accepts him by offering him all emotional support. Their first-night after marriage goes on with Aniyan Thampuran narrating silly and trivial things. He and Karthika visit Karthika's house and he learns the poor conditions of her family. Though Aniyan Thampuran offers help to the family, her father declines it telling it will tarnish his prestige if he took any help from the family to where his daughter is married off. Meanwhile, there comes a person named Balan Master who claims to be a writer. Aniyan Thampuran befriends him. Aniyan Thampuran's childish acts continue even after marriage. One day he requests Pushpangadan, pappan of an elephant to take him on the elephant back. He agrees this but Aniyan Thampuran is scolded by Ettan Thampuran when he sees his brother on elephant back. Ettan Thampuran continuously sells land to make up for his debts. In all these land proceedings Aniyan Thampuran has no role to play than to sign the documents where he is instructed to. In one of the evenings of Aniyan Thampuran with Balan Master, while narrating his (Aniyan Thampuran's) demeanour and how people sees him Balan Master tells casually to him to show some courage and authority so that gradually people's attitude toward him will be changed. Aniyan Thampuran takes this and he becomes successful to some extent like when the issue of selling one of their properties is raised and when Pangunni Nair's daughter tried to raise her voice in the Kovilakom. He feels great after doing this and tells so to his wife Karthika. One day he learns that Balan Master had a romantic relationship with his wife Karthika and the Master has not emotionally recovered from it yet. He confirms this with Balan Master. Some days later Ravi, Ettan Thampuran is bitten by a snake after his stay with Pangunni Nair's daughter. Before death he tells Aniyan Thampuran that he (Aniyan Thampuran) was right but it is too late for any amendments. After Ettan Thampuran's death creditors arrive at the Kovilakom and demand money. Some days later a letter of attachment (for seizing all of the property) from court arrives. The next day, concerning the situations, Ettan Thampuran's widow leaves the house. The night before the tragic events unfold, Aniyan Thampuran muses over his misfortune and the ill fate of the Kovilakom. In the morning, determined to do something tragic Aniyan Thampuran walks happily to the place where children, his old company play. Near there, on a tree using the cord of a swing he kills himself (before the next festival) asking the children to clap, for which he calls a trick in a circus. In the end we see Karthika, wife of Aniyan Thampuran is cherishing her emotional connection with him, determined not to have a new life.

Cast

Mohanlal as Aniyan Thampuran
Parvathy Jayaram as Karthika
Jayaram as Rajan
Sukumaran as Ravi
Kaviyoor Ponnamma as Kalyaniyamma
Devan as Balan Master
Sankaradi as Pangunni Nair
Sumithra as Ettathi
Sukumari as Bhageerathi
Philomina as Muthassi
Valsala Menon as Narayanikutty
Urmila Unni
Sabitha Anand as Indira
Jagathy Sreekumar as Madhavan Kutty
Kuthiravattam Pappu as Pushpangadan
Vishnu Ravee as Junior Aniyan Thampuran 
Suma Jayaram as Malathi

Reception
The film performed well at the box office. Mohanlal won the Kerala State Film Award – Special Jury Award for his performance in the film.

References

External links
 
 

1989 films
1980s Malayalam-language films